If the Huns Came to Melbourne is a 1916 Australian silent film directed by George Coates. A World War I propaganda tale, it is considered a lost film. It was not widely shown and was made with a low budget.

Production
Interior scenes were shot in an open air at Albert Park in Melbourne.

Release
Advertising for the film stated that:
Imagine, if you can, the nameless horrors perpetuated on helpless Belgians in the name of German Kulture! Think for a moment on a repetition of the dreadful nightmare in Melbourne. Picture those nearest and dearest to you at the mercy of the Huns! This is what the producers have set out to do in this remarkable picture.

The film was screened privately for Australia's then Minister for Defence, Senator George Pearce.

References

External links
 
 The Effectiveness of Australian Film Propaganda for the War Effort 1914-1918 by Daniel Reynaud at Screening the Past

Australian black-and-white films
Lost Australian films
1916 films
1916 drama films
Australian war drama films
Australian silent short films
1910s war drama films
1916 lost films
Lost war drama films
1910s English-language films
Silent war drama films